Mēn (Greek:  "month; Moon", presumably influenced by Avestan måŋha) was a lunar god worshipped in the western interior parts of Anatolia. He is attested in various localized variants, such as Mēn Askaenos in Antioch in Pisidia, or Mēn Pharnakou at Ameria in Pontus.

Mēn is often found in association with Persianate elements, especially with the goddess Anahita.
Lunar symbolism dominates his iconography. The god is usually shown with the horns of a crescent emerging from behind his shoulders, and he is described as the god presiding over the (lunar) months. Strabo describes Mēn as a local god of the Phrygians.
Mēn may be influenced by the Zoroastrian lunar divinity Mah.

Mēn Pharnakou
In the Kingdom of Pontus, there was a  temple estate dedicated to Mēn Pharnakou and Selene at Ameria, near Cabira (Strabo 12.3.31). The temple was probably established by Pharnakes I in the 2nd century BC, apparently in an attempt to counter-balance the influence of the Moon goddess Ma of Comana.
The cult of Mēn Pharnakou in Pontus has been traced to the appearance of the star and crescent motif on Pontic coins at the time.

Mēn Askaenos
Taşlıalan (1988) in a study of Antioch in Pisidia has remarked that the people who settled on the acropolis in the Greek colonial era  carried the Mēn Askaenos cult down to the plain as Patrios Theos and in the place where the Augusteum was built there are some signs of this former cult as bucrania on the rock-cut walls.

Roman reception

Autochthonous Mēn as attested in Anatolia is to be distinguished from his reception as a "Phrygian god" in Rome during the imperial period. Here, Mēn is depicted with a Phrygian cap and a belted tunic. He may be accompanied by bulls and lions in religious artwork. The Roman iconography of Mēn partly recalls that of Mithras, who also wears a Phrygian cap and is commonly depicted with a bull and symbols of the Sun and Moon.

The Augustan History has the Roman emperor Caracalla (r. 198–217) venerate Lunus at Carrhae; this, i.e. a masculine variant of the feminine Latin noun luna "Moon", has been taken as a Latinized name for Mēn. The same source records the local opinion that anyone who believes the deity of the Moon to be feminine shall always be subject to women, whereas a man who believes that he is masculine will dominate his wife. David Magie suggests that Caracalla had actually visited the temple of Sin, the Mesopotamian Moon god.

In later times, Mēn may also have been identified with both Attis of Phrygia and Sabazius of Thrace.

See also
Minos
Mah
Ma (goddess)
Máni
Mithraism
List of lunar deities

References

Bibliography
 Guy Labarre, "Les origines et la diffusion du culte de Men". In: Bru, Hadrien, François Kirbihler and Stéphane Lebreton (edd.). L’Asie mineure dans l’Antiquité: Échanges, populations et territoires. Rennes: Presses Universitaires des Rennes, 2009. pp. 389-414.

Further reading
 Sekunda, Nicholas. "The cult of Men Tiamou, preliminary remarks". In: Miscellanea Anthropologica et Sociologica 15/3 (2014), 149-156.
 Tacheva-Hitova, Margarita. "MÊN". In: Eastern Cults in Moesia Inferior and Thracia (5th Century B.C.-4th Century A.D.). Leiden, The Netherlands: Brill, 2015 [1983]. pp. 277–279. doi: https://doi.org/10.1163/9789004295735_013
 Vitas, Nadežda Gavrilović. “Mēn”. In: Ex Asia et Syria: Oriental Religions in the Roman Central Balkans. Archaeopress, 2021. pp. 123–29. https://doi.org/10.2307/j.ctv1gt94hj.15.

External links

Oliver Robert Gurney, "Anatolian Religion: The Phrygians". Encyclopædia Britannica online. 

Anatolian deities
Lunar gods
Phrygian gods
Hellenistic Anatolian deities